Te Felicito may refer to:

"Te Felicito" (Grupo Mojado song), 1992
"Te Felicito" (Shakira and Rauw Alejandro song), 2022